İkinci Alıbəyli is a village in the municipality of Alıbəyli in the Agdam Rayon of Azerbaijan.

References

Populated places in Aghdam District